Grace Reksten Skaugen (born November 1953) is the chairperson of the Norwegian Institute of Directors and deputy chairperson of Statoil. She is a member of the council of the International Institute for Strategic Studies.

References

Living people
1953 births
Norwegian business executives
Equinor people